Rattu is a small village town located at the Astore district in the Northern Areas now known as Gilgit Baltistan of Pakistan. Rattu has been traditionally used as a route for traders going to Kashmir from Astore, Gilgit and others parts of present-day Gilgit Baltistan of Pakistan. Rattu is known for its delicacies: cumin (zeera, jeera, zira) and trout fish.

Rattu is a busy town where agriculture includes cattle, pastures, and dairy products. Its people speak the Astori dialect of Shina.

Rattu is home to adventure sports too, with a natural skiing slope and facilities for training in winter sports. Fishing and trophy hunting for markhors are still common in the area.

The Pakistan Army’s High Altitude School is located in Rattu.

See also
 Rattu Cantonment

References

Populated places in Astore District
Ski areas and resorts in Pakistan